Nycteus testaceus is a species of plate-thigh beetle in the family Eucinetidae. It is found in North America.

References

Further reading

 

Scirtoidea
Articles created by Qbugbot
Beetles described in 1866